Choanograptis parorthota is a species of moth of the family Tortricidae. It is found on the Bismarck Archipelago off the northeastern coast of New Guinea.

References

Moths described in 1928
Archipini